Zyganisus cadigalorum is a moth in the family Cossidae. It is found in Australia, where it has been recorded from the Sydney area.

The wingspan is 41–62 mm for males and 59–65 mm for females. The forewings are dark ash grey, but whitish along the costa subbasally and centrally and with several transverse black strigulae (fine streaks) and lines. The hindwings are uniform dark grey. Adults are on wing from late April to mid-July.

Etymology
The species name is derived from the Cadigal people.

References

Natural History Museum Lepidoptera generic names catalog

Cossinae
Moths described in 2012